Paraíso ("Paradise") is a 1970 Mexican film. It was directed by Luis Alcoriza.

External links
 

1970 films
Mexican comedy-drama films
1970s Spanish-language films
Films directed by Luis Alcoriza
1970s Mexican films